This article covers the solo career of Tim Neufeld and his career with his band Tim and the Glory Boys. For Neufeld's career as part of Starfield, see Starfield (band) 

Tim Neufeld (born April 7, 1976) is a Canadian singer, songwriter and recording artist from Winnipeg, Manitoba and now based in Chilliwack, British Columbia, best known as the co-founder and lead singer of Starfield who are four-time Juno Award nominees, Western Canada Music award recipients, winners of 10 GMA Canada Covenant Awards (CGMA) and two Dove Awards. He is currently lead singer of the country music group Tim and the Glory Boys.

Starfield

Tim Neufeld started as the lead vocalist and guitarist of the contemporary worship music band Starfield which he founded in 2000 along with his brother Jon Neufeld.

After releasing three independent albums and four albums with EMI/Sparrow Records with accompanying tours, Starfield was put on hiatus while each brother pursuing solo projects.

Solo career
In June 2013, Neufeld released his first solo album, Trees, which garnered him the GMA Canada Covenant Award 2013 for Modern Worship Album of the Year and the 2014 Juno Award for Contemporary Christian/Gospel Album of the Year. Trees is a collection of worship songs written by Christian artists such as Matt Redman, Michael Gungor, Paul Baloche and All Sons & Daughters among others and has been described as "Matt Redman meets Mumford and Sons".

Neufeld's first solo album, Trees, won the 2014 Juno Award for Contemporary Christian/Gospel Album of the Year as well as the award for the 2013 CGMA Modern Worship Album of the Year. He released Trees Chapter 2 as a follow up on October 9, 2015.

Tim and the Glory Boys
Neufeld formed in 2013 the Canadian country and bluegrass trio The Glory Boys, and the formation became known as Tim and the Glory Boys and at times Tim Neufeld and the Glory Boys

At the beginning the band was known as "Tim Neufeld & The Hallelujah Glory Boys" but later the name was shortened. Neufeld assembled the band that included Colin Trask (drummer/percussionist for Starfield), Matthew Izaguirre (bassist), Jon Bryant (indie Canadian singer-songwriter on banjo, guitars and dulcimer) and Jon Mushaluk (stand up bass). Neufeld remained the lead singer and frontman.

The band embarked on the Trees Tour in which the band performed in 60+ Canadian cities. The formation released the album The Joy under the new name in September 2014 and earned the band a 2015 Juno nomination.

Initially Tim and the Glory Boys was a Canadian Christian band based in Abbotsford, British Columbia. Later on it became more of a contemporary country and bluegrass band. Neufeld and Colin Trask were previously in the Canadian band Starfield. The band is signed to Sony Canada Canada.

The songs from the album Trees took on a distinct bluegrass feel when played live on tour with the featured use of banjo, dobro and dulcimer. Neufeld described the band's sound as "newgrass". During the course of the Trees Tour the band took on the moniker

Originally the formation was called "Tim Neufeld & The Hallelujah Glory Boys" and was a Christian formation. Neufeld and the band spent time in Nashville in early 2014 recording with Starfield producer Allen Salmon crafting songs for Neufeld's second album of original songs, and a debut for the formation. The resulting album The Joy, which was released in September 2014 in the band's name. The Joy earned a 2015 Juno Award nominated for "Gospel Album of the Year".

Neufeld's solo album, Trees Chapter 2 was released on October 9, 2015. Tim & the Glory Boys embarked on the Canadian Joyride Tour.

This was followed by Hootenanny! in 2016 by the formation Tim and the Glory Boys formation winning the Juno award for "Contemporary Christian/Gospel Album of the Year" in 2017. They also won two Covenant awards for "Group of the Year" and "Artist of the Year".

Starting 2018, the band released a series of singles including "Blessed" in 2019, "When You Know You Know", "Without a Prayer" and "Right Back Atcha" in 2020 along with "Me Without You" and "Bloodlines" in 2021. The band also released the acoustic two-song small EP The Acoustic Sessions in 2021. They released the single "Float" in 2022.

Discography

Albums 
as Tim Neufeld 
 Trees (June 4, 2013)
 Trees - Chapter 2 (October 9, 2015)

as Tim and the Glory Boys
 The Joy (September 9, 2014)
 Hootenanny! (September 16, 2016)

Singles 
as Tim Neufeld 
 "I'm Free" (2014)

as Tim and the Glory Boys
 "Overhead Projector" (2016)
 "Blessed" (January 3, 2019)
 "When You Know You Know" (February 14, 2020)
 "Without a Prayer" (August 28, 2020)
 "Right Back Atcha" (November 27, 2020)
 "Me Without You" (June 4, 2021)
 "Bloodlines" (December 1, 2021)
 "Float" (July 8, 2022)
 "Skate" (January 2023)

Other songs 
 "When You Know You Know" / "Me Without You" (as a two-song release as The Acoustic Sessions) (February 5, 2021)

Awards
GMA Covenant Awards

Juno Awards

Canadian Country Music Association Awards

Notes 

 2013 Covenant Award Winners:
 Juno 2014 Nominees and Winners
 Tim Neufeld Wins 2014 Juno for Contemporary Christian/Gospel Album, Trees
 Tim Neufeld Artist Profile
 Tim Neufeld: Trees
 Juno Award for Tim Neufeld of Abbotsford
 Kevin's Music Picks: Tim Neufeld, Trees
 Juno Gala Winners
 New Release Tuesday: THE JOY
 Called to pursue joy: Tim Neufeld and the Glory Boys take bluegrass to church

References

External links
Official Tim and the Glory Boys website
Tim and the Glory Boys YouTube channel
Starfield Online Official website

Canadian male singer-songwriters
Canadian gospel singers
Canadian rock guitarists
Canadian male guitarists
Musicians from Winnipeg
Musicians from British Columbia
People from Abbotsford, British Columbia
1976 births
Living people
Juno Award for Contemporary Christian/Gospel Album of the Year winners
21st-century Canadian guitarists
21st-century Canadian male singers
Mennonite musicians
Canadian Mennonites